The ZTE Tania is the first Windows Phone device manufactured by ZTE.

Hardware

The ZTE Tania is a Windows Phone device which is meant to serve the lower-end market. The phone has a 4.3-inch WVGA 800x480 TN LCD screen, 5-megapixel autofocus camera, and 4 GB of storage.

See also
ZTE Orbit

References

Mobile phones introduced in 2012
Windows Phone devices
Smartphones
Tania